The Hills Were Joyful Together is a 1953 novel by Jamaican author Roger Mais.

Plot

In Jamaica during the Second World War, Surjue is persuaded to take part in a robbery and is imprisoned.

Reception

Mais said that the intention of his novel was "to give the world a true picture of the real Jamaica and the dreadful condition of the working classes."

In Imagination, Emblems, and Expressions: Essays on Latin American, Caribbean, and Continental Culture and Identity (1993), Margaret K. Bass writes that Mais notes the depiction of violence, pain and suffering in the book, but says "Mais does not intend to portray the baseness of the lower class. Mais shows us, rather, that the people in the lower class are victims, and that poverty can reduce the human to the inhuman. Violence [...] gives an otherwise powerless people a temporary feeling of control over the particular life or a particular situation."

In 2022, The Hills Were Joyful Together was included on the Big Jubilee Read, a list of 70 books by Commonwealth authors produced to celebrate Queen Elizabeth II's Platinum Jubilee.

References

1953 novels
Novels set in Jamaica
Kingston, Jamaica
Novels set during World War II
Novels set in prison
Novels about poverty
Jonathan Cape books